Ampharete is a genus of polychaete annelid worms. They have a single, chevron-shaped row of teeth.

Species 
The World Register of Marine Species recognizes the following 45 species:

 Ampharete acutifrons (Grube, 1860)
 Ampharete agulhasensis (Day, 1961)
 Ampharete americana Day, 1973
 Ampharete ampullata Imajima, Reuscher & Fiege, 2012
 Ampharete arctica Malmgren, 1866
 Ampharete baltica Eliason, 1955
 Ampharete borealis (M. Sars, 1856)
 Ampharete californica (Hilbig, 2000)
 Ampharete capensis (Day, 1961)
 Ampharete cinnamomea Imajima, Reuscher & Fiege, 2012
 Ampharete cornuta (Hilbig, 2000)
 Ampharete crassiseta Annenkova, 1929
 Ampharete debrouweri Jeldes & Lefevre, 1959
 Ampharete eupalea Chamberlin, 1920
 Ampharete falcata Eliason, 1955
 Ampharete finmarchica (M. Sars, 1865)
 Ampharete gagarae Uschakov, 1950
 Ampharete goesi Malmgren, 1866
 Ampharete homa Chamberlin, 1919
 Ampharete johanseni Chamberlin, 1920
 Ampharete kerguelensis McIntosh, 1885
 Ampharete kudenovi Jirkov, 1994
 Ampharete labrops Hartman, 1961
 Ampharete lindstroemi Malmgren, 1867 sensu Hessle, 1917
 Ampharete lineata (Berkeley & Berkeley, 1943)
 Ampharete longipaleolata Uschakov, 1950
 Ampharete luederitzi (Augener, 1918)
 Ampharete macrobranchia Caullery, 1944
 Ampharete manriquei (Salazar-Vallejo, 1996)
 Ampharete minuta Langerhans, 1880
 Ampharete octocirrata (Sars, 1835)
 Ampharete oculata (Webster, 1879)
 Ampharete oculicirrata Parapar, Moreira & Barnich, 2019
 Ampharete parvidentata Day, 1973
 Ampharete petersenae Zhirkov, 1997
 Ampharete reducta Chamberlin, 1920
 Ampharete santillani Parapar, Kongsrud, Kongshavn, Alvestad, Aneiros & Moreira, 2017
 Ampharete saphronovae Jirkov, 1994
 Ampharete setosa Verrill, 1873
 Ampharete sibirica (Wirén, 1883)
 Ampharete sombreriana McIntosh, 1885
 Ampharete trilobata Webster & Benedict, 1887
 Ampharete undecima Alvestad, Kongsrud & Kongshavn, 2014
 Ampharete vega (Wirén, 1883)
 Ampharete villenai Parapar, Helgason, Jirkov & Moreira, 2012

References 

Terebellida